CEROS 200 (CElsius tech Radar and Optronic Site) is a radar and optronic tracking fire control director designed by Saab for use along with the  9LV Naval Fire Control System on naval ships. When interfaced to modern missile or gun systems it provides defence against any modern threat including advanced sea skimming missiles or asymmetric surface threats in littoral environments.

Features
The radar design incorporates many electronic counter-countermeasures:
 Very low antenna side lobes
 Very wide bandwidth
 A large number of transmit frequencies
 Random selection of frequency
 Lock on jam, track on jam
Unlike other fire control radars, the CEROS 200 can guide 2 missiles, like the ESSM, at once.

Accuracy
The CEROS 200 director provides 3D tracking. This enables the operator to deal with advanced air and surface threats.

FCS firing accuracy as measured by an independent agency in a range of conditions:

Within 1 meter (radius): 36%

1–2 meter (radius): 23%

2–4 meter (radius): 19%

4–6 meter (radius): 22%

Specifications
Tracking radar	 
 Frequency range:	     Ku-band, 15.5-17.5 GHz
 Pulse Compressor:	     Frequency coded
Transmitter	 
 Type: 	      Grid-pulse helix TWT
 Output power:	      1.5 kW peak 4 percent duty cycle
 Number of frequencies:    More than 100
 Transmission patterns :    Pulse Doppler: 32-pulse batches
 MTI :	              4-pulse batches
 Frequency agility:	pulse-to-pulse frequency agility
Director pedestal	 
 Type:	2-axis, elevation over azimuth
 Angular speed:	2 rad/s
 Angular acceleration: 	10 rad/s2
Dimension and weight	 
 Height above deck:	Approximately 2 meters
 Diameter:	Approximately 1.6 meters
 Weight:	625–750 kg depending on version

See also

References 

Naval radars
Military radars of Sweden